Gelsenwasser AG is a German utilities company that supplies natural gas and fresh water to residents in Germany. Areas of service include Ruhr, Lower Rhine, Westphalia, Lower Saxony, Brandenburg, Mecklenburg-Western Pomerania, Münster, and Saxony-Anhalt. The company also provides wastewater filtration services.

External links

What is Gelsenwasser AG?

References 

Natural gas companies of Germany
Water companies of Germany
Companies based in North Rhine-Westphalia
Companies based in Gelsenkirchen